Julia Wachtel (born 1956) is a contemporary American painter. Wachtel's early work included mixed media installation, now primarily working as a painter. Wachtel is often associated with The Pictures Generation artists.

Biography
Wachtel attended Middlebury College where she earned a B.A.  She spent one year at The School of Visual Arts in New York City, studying with Vito Acconci, Joseph Kosuth, Joan Jonas, amongst others. She then studied at the Whitney Independent Study Program. Wachtel was the production manager of the UK edition of Vanity Fair for ten years.

Solo exhibitions
2019 HELPP, at Mary Boone Gallery, New York.
2018 Elizabeth Dee Gallery, New York.
2014 Kunsthalle Bergen, Norway.
2014 Elizabeth Dee Gallery, New York. 
2013 Post Culture at Vilma Gold Gallery, London.
1993 Julia Wachtel at American Fine Arts, New York.

Collections
Wachtel's work is included in the collections of the Whitney Museum of American Art, the Cleveland Museum of Art, The Museum of Modern Art, The Brooklyn Museum, and the Museum of Contemporary Art, Los Angeles.

References

American women painters
1956 births
Living people
20th-century American painters
20th-century American women artists
21st-century American painters
21st-century American women artists